The second season of The WB American television drama series 7th Heaven premiered on September 15, 1997, and concluded on May 11, 1998, with a total of 22 episodes.

Cast and characters

Main cast 
Stephen Collins as Eric Camden
Catherine Hicks as Annie Camden
Barry Watson as Matt Camden
David Gallagher as Simon Camden
Jessica Biel as Mary Camden
Beverley Mitchell as Lucy Camden
Mackenzie Rosman as Ruthie Camden
Happy as Happy the Dog

Episodes

References

1997 American television seasons
1998 American television seasons